The men's 200 metres T11 took place in Stadium Australia.

There were four heats with two semifinals and one final round. The T11 is for athletes who have a visual impairments and would run with guides.

Heats

Heat 1

Heat 2

Heat 3

Heat 4

Semifinals

Heat 1

Heat 2

Final round

References

Athletics at the 2000 Summer Paralympics